Albert Edward Nixon Chester (17 March 1886 – 21 December 1962) was an English professional footballer, best remembered for his years as an inside left in the Southern League with Croydon Common and Queens Park Rangers. Earlier in his career, he played league football with Preston North End and guested for Brentford, Tottenham Hotspur and Millwall Athletic during the First World War.

Personal life 
As of 1939, Chester was working as a bricklayer and living in Easington.

Career statistics

Honours 
Croydon Common

 Southern League Second Division: 1913–14

References

1886 births
English footballers
Sportspeople from Hexham
Footballers from Northumberland
Brentford F.C. players
English Football League players
Association football inside forwards
Preston North End F.C. players
Croydon Common F.C. players
Southern Football League players
1962 deaths
Brentford F.C. wartime guest players
Millwall F.C. wartime guest players
Tottenham Hotspur F.C. wartime guest players
Queens Park Rangers F.C. players
Ramsgate F.C. players
Wingate Albion F.C. players

British bricklayers